Pattapu is a recently described Dravidian language of Andhra Pradesh. It has yet to be classified.

External links
ISO request with word-list appended

References

Dravidian languages
Languages of Andhra Pradesh